Phytometra formosalis is a species of moth of the family Erebidae. It is known from Australia, including Queensland.

Adults are gold with a maroon costa and margin to each forewing. The head has dark brown eyes.

References

Boletobiinae